Aleksandr Mikhailovich Lvov (born 27 January 1972 in Leningrad) is a Russian auto racing driver.

Career
He is twice champion of the Russian Touring Car Championship. First in 2001 with an Opel Astra, and again in 2007 with a Honda Accord. In 2006 he won the Super Production class in the FIA European Touring Car Cup, in a Honda Civic at Estoril.

In 2007 he competed in two rounds of the FIA World Touring Car Championship in a Honda Accord Euro R, alongside fellow Russian Andrey Smetsky for the Golden Motors team. He returned to the WTCC in 2008 for selected rounds, his best placed finish was 16th in race two at Valencia.

Complete World Touring Car Championship results
(key) (Races in bold indicate pole position) (Races in italics indicate fastest lap)

References

1972 births
Living people
Sportspeople from Saint Petersburg
Russian racing drivers
World Touring Car Championship drivers
European Touring Car Cup drivers
Russian Circuit Racing Series drivers